Pseudoramonia is a genus of lichenized fungi in the family Thelotremataceae.

It was first described in by Gintaras Kantvilas and Antonin Vězda in 2000, with the type species designated as Pseudoramonia stipitata.

References

Ostropales
Lichen genera
Ostropales genera
Taxa named by Gintaras Kantvilas